Tlamim (lit. Furrows) is a moshav in southern Israel. Located in Hevel Lakhish it falls under the jurisdiction of Lakhish Regional Council.

History
The moshav was founded in 1950 by Jewish refugees from the island of Djerba in Tunisia as part of the effort to settle the region. Its name is derived from a verse in the Book of Psalms (65:11): "Thou waterest the ridges thereof abundantly, thou settlest the furrows thereof."

It was founded on the land belonging to the  depopulated  Palestinian village of Burayr.

References 

Moshavim
Populated places established in 1950
Populated places in Southern District (Israel)
1950 establishments in Israel
Tunisian-Jewish culture in Israel